Shohreh Aghdashloo (née Vaziri-Tabar; 11 May 1952) is an Iranian and American actress. Following numerous starring roles on the stage, she made her film debut in Chess of the Wind (1976). Her next two films The Report (1977) and Sooteh Delan (1977) garnered critical acclaim and established Aghdashloo as one of Iran's leading ladies, although the films were banned in Iran itself.

Aghdashloo moved to England during the Iranian Revolution in 1979 and then to the United States, subsequently becoming a U.S. citizen. After several years playing small roles in television and film, her performance in House of Sand and Fog (2003) brought her several film critics' awards and a nomination for an Academy Award for Best Supporting Actress. Her other film appearances include The Exorcism of Emily Rose (2005), X-Men: The Last Stand and The Nativity Story (both 2006), The Odd Life of Timothy Green (2013) and Star Trek Beyond (2016).

In television, she is best known for her roles as Dina Araz in the fourth season of 24 and as Chrisjen Avasarala on The Expanse (2015–2022). For her role as Sajida Talfah in the HBO miniseries House of Saddam (2008), she won the Primetime Emmy Award for Outstanding Supporting Actress in a Limited Series or Movie. In 2013, she released her autobiography titled The Alley of Love and Yellow Jasmines. In 2021, she voiced Grayson in Netflix's acclaimed magepunk series, Arcane.

Early life 
Aghdashloo was born Shohreh Vaziri-Tabar in Tehran, the daughter of Effie ( alSadat) and Anushiravan Vaziri-Tabar. She has three brothers: Shahram, Shahriar and Shahrokh. Her stage name is from the family name of her first husband, painter Aydin Aghdashloo. After their marriage in 1972 when she was 19 and he was 31, she began attending theatre workshops, against the wishes of her family. She had always wanted to be an actress, and soon began playing leading roles in Iranian theatre and film. They did not have children and were divorced in 1979, when she left Iran for England at the start of the Iranian Revolution.

Once Aghdashloo arrived in England, she earned a bachelor's degree in international relations at Brunel University because of her interest in politics after having to leave her home country. She was already familiar with England, as her parents had taken her to London as a child. She then continued to pursue her acting career, which brought her to Los Angeles. In 1987, Aghdashloo married actor/playwright Houshang Touzie. They have a daughter, Tara Touzie, born in 1989. She has since performed in a number of Touzie's plays, successfully taking them to national and international stages, primarily in the Iranian diaspora. Though born to a Muslim family, she has stated that she is non-practicing.

Career 

Aghdashloo first began working as a theatre actress at the age of 19, when she starred in a theatrical adaptation of the novel The Narrow Road to the Deep North (1973). Aghdashloo made her American film debut in 1989 in a starring role in Guests of Hotel Astoria. Her television debut came on September 25, 1990, in a guest role in the two-hour episode of the NBC television series Matlock, titled "Nowhere to Turn: A Matlock Mystery Movie". In the years that followed Aghdashloo appeared on screen sporadically, including in the widely panned Surviving Paradise (2000), written and directed by Kamshad Kooshan.

In 2001 Aghdashloo was cast opposite Ben Kingsley and Jennifer Connelly in director Vadim Perelman's House of Sand and Fog (2003) for which she was nominated for the Academy Award for Best Supporting Actress. Following this exposure Aghdashloo had a prominent recurring role in Season 4 of the Fox television series 24, playing Dina Araz, a terrorist undercover in Los Angeles as a well-to-do housewife and mother. In an interview with Time magazine, Aghdashloo stated that although she had previously resisted reinforcing the stereotype of Muslims as terrorists, the strength and complexity of the role convinced her to accept it. Iranian film scholar Hamid Naficy criticized Aghdashloo's acting in "the sensationalist film The Stoning of Soraya M." as "discredit[ing] her vow not to play in films that stereotype Middle Easterners, including Iranians." In the period that followed, Aghdashloo made guest appearances on several well-known television series, such as Will & Grace, ER and Grey's Anatomy. She also played supporting roles in films such as X-Men: The Last Stand as Dr. Kavita Rao, The Lake House, The Nativity Story as Elizabeth, and The Sisterhood of the Traveling Pants 2.

In 2008, Aghdashloo served as an official festival judge at the second annual Noor Iranian Film Festival in Los Angeles, while she also played the lead character of Zahra Khanum in the film The Stoning of Soraya M., marking her first leading role in a feature-length American film. In the same year, she also portrayed Sajida Talfah in the HBO original miniseries House of Saddam for which she received the Primetime Emmy Award for Outstanding Supporting Actress in a Limited Series or Movie. Speaking to a crowd of over 1,400 people at George Washington University's Lisner Auditorium on September 12, 2009, Aghdashloo, author Dr. Azar Nafisi, and Dr. Dwight Bashir, Associate Director for Policy at the United States Commission on International Religious Freedom, added their voices to those concerned about human rights in Iran and the persecution of Baháʼís in Iran. Aghdashloo's talk in particular was posted to YouTube. On October 9, 2010, the Public Affairs Alliance of Iranian Americans awarded Aghdashloo their Career Achievement Award during its first annual gala.

Agdashloo continues to act in films, such as The Odd Life of Timothy Green, Septembers of Shiraz and Star Trek Beyond; and on television, guest starring on series such as House, M.D., The Simpsons, Grimm, Law & Order: Special Victims Unit and NCIS. She also voiced characters for the video games Mass Effect 2, Mass Effect 3, Destiny and Destiny 2; starred in the London revival of the play The House of Bernarda Alba at the Almeida Theatre as Bernarda Alba; and narrated the audiobook And the Mountains Echoed, by Khaled Hosseini.

Aghdashloo recently starred in Amazon Prime Video's acclaimed television series The Expanse, as UN Deputy Undersecretary of Executive Administration Chrisjen Avasarala, a "smart and passionate member of a political family legacy who has risen high in the ranks of Earth's governing body without once standing for election".

Filmography

Film

Television

Video games

Audio

Theatre

Other awards 
 2007: Arpa Career Achievement Award
 2013: Noor Iranian Film Festival Achievement Award

See also 
 Women in Iran
 List of Iranian women
 List of Iranian actresses
 Forugh Farrokhzad
 Mina Assadi
 Simin Behbahani
 List of actors with Academy Award nominations

References

External links 

 
 
 
 The Shohreh Aghdashloo You Need to Know
 [http://www.ghaffaris.com Her heritage and family website

1952 births
Living people
20th-century American actresses
20th-century Iranian actresses
21st-century American actresses
21st-century Iranian actresses
Actresses from Tehran
American film actresses
American stage actresses
American television actresses
American video game actresses
American voice actresses
Independent Spirit Award for Best Supporting Female winners
Iranian diaspora film people
Iranian emigrants to the United States
Iranian film actresses
Iranian stage actresses
Iranian television actresses
Iranian voice actresses
Outstanding Performance by a Supporting Actress in a Miniseries or Movie Primetime Emmy Award winners